Willi Titze (19 February 1890 – 30 August 1979) was a German painter. His work was part of the painting event in the art competition at the 1936 Summer Olympics.

References

1890 births
1979 deaths
20th-century German painters
20th-century German male artists
German male painters
Olympic competitors in art competitions
Painters from Hamburg